2,4,5-Trihydroxyamphetamine (THM) is a neurotoxin and a metabolite of MDMA. It comes from the ring-hydroxylation of 3,4-methylenedioxyamphetamine (MDA).

In one paper, it was shown to reduce hippocampal tryptophan hydroxylase activity by 54% after short-term treatment. In another study, it was shown to significantly reduce striatal tyrosine hydroxylase activity.

See also
 2,4,5-Trihydroxymethamphetamine
 5,7-Dihydroxytryptamine

References

Neurotoxins
Substituted amphetamines
Recreational drug metabolites